Spelthorne was a hundred (dated subdivision) of the historic county of Middlesex, England.  It contained these parishes and settlements:
Ashford
East Bedfont
The hamlet of Hatton
Feltham
Hampton
The settlement of Hampton Hill developed in the 19th century
Hampton Wick
Hanworth
Laleham
Littleton since the 1970s contiguous with Shepperton
The chapelry of Astleham/Aslam. In the 1930s replaced with the Queen Mary Reservoir.
Shepperton
Staines
Stanwell
The hamlet of Stanwell Moor, since the 20th century a village without a church
Sunbury
The hamlet of Upper Halliford, today a village, joined postally with Shepperton
The hamlet of Charlton, joined postally with Shepperton
Teddington
Part of the neighbourhood of Fulwell, once a single-ownership estate, by consensus spreading south to around to its train station

The present-day district of Spelthorne in Surrey amounts to about 59% of the hundred.  The eastern parts since 1965 form parts of the London boroughs of Hounslow and Richmond upon Thames.

Demography
A decennial table for each parish is published in the Victoria County History series. By 1891 the Hundred was legally moribund, having already been de facto moribund.  The population of the north-eastern six parishes has been greater than the south-west seven since an unknowable point in time between the 1831 and 1841 censuses.  A summary is:

Relative to the county as a whole, the hundred (one of six) had 12.9% of its 181,320 acres.  In 1801 it had 1.3% of the 818,129 people recorded as living in Middlesex; in 1901 it had 1.6% of the 3,585,323 people stated in the census to be living in the county (including in the County of London parts which once lay in Middlesex).

See also
TW postcode area, the centre-west bulk of which corresponds with Spelthorne Hundred. It adds Richmond, Brentford, Isleworth Hundred (or half-hundred) and Egham 
Spelthorne (UK Parliament constituency), a seat of the House of Commons since 1918 which was initially larger and is since 1945 smaller than the Hundred.

References

Hundreds and divisions of Middlesex
History of local government in London (pre-1855)
History of the London Borough of Hounslow
History of the London Borough of Richmond upon Thames
Borough of Spelthorne